Leshem is one of the Hoshen jewels. It is a Hebrew name, meaning "precious gem".

Leshem may also refer to:

People

Surname 
 Edan Leshem (born 1997), Israeli tennis player
 Giora Leshem (1940–2011), Israeli poet and translator
 Naomi Leshem (born 1963), Israeli artist-photographer
 Ron Leshem (born 1976), Israeli writer

Known as Leshem 
 Shlomo Elyashiv - Rabbi and kabbalist, also called Ha-Leshem

Places 
 Leshem, previous name of Dan (ancient city)
 Leshem (Israeli settlement), an Israeli settlement